Bahşiş is a town in Tarsus district of Mersin Province, Turkey. Distance to Tarsus is .The population of the town is 2343

as of 2012.

References

Populated places in Mersin Province
Towns in Turkey
Populated places in Tarsus District